In the AFL Women's (AFLW), the West Coast Club Champion award is awarded to the best and fairest player at the West Coast Eagles during the home-and-away season. The award has been awarded annually since the club's inaugural season in the competition in 2020, and Dana Hooker was the inaugural winner of the award.

Recipients

See also

 John Worsfold Medal (list of West Coast Eagles best and fairest winners in the Australian Football League)

References

Australian rules football awards
AFL Women's
West Coast Eagles
Awards established in 2020
Australian rules football-related lists